Sheydan (also Romanized as Sheydān and Shīdān; also known as Shāhidān) is a village in Sarvestan Rural District, in the Central District of Bavanat County, Fars Province, Iran. At the 2006 census, its population was 499, in 146 families.

References 

Populated places in Bavanat County